Clostridium beijerinckii is a gram positive, rod shaped, motile bacterium of the genus Clostridium. It has been isolated from feces and soil. Produces oval to subterminal spores. it is named after Martinus Beijerinck who is a Dutch bacteriologist.

Industrially interesting for its ability to produce butanol, acetone and/or isopropanol at strictly anaerobic conditions at 37 °C using a wide range of substrates including (but not limited to) pentoses, hexoses and starch. Its ability to grow in simple, inexpensive media, stability in regard to strain degeneration, good adaptability to continuous processes and sustained production of solvents well into the log phase are other advantages of this bacterium.

Recent developments have shown it is a possible candidate for efficient hydrogen production.

See also
 Clostridium acetobutylicum
 Butanol
 A.B.E. process

References

External links
  Type strain of Clostridium beijerinckii at BacDive –  the Bacterial Diversity Metadatabase

Biofuels
Gram-positive bacteria
beijerinckii